Kalol may refer to several places in India:

 Kalol, Gandhinagar, a city in Gandhinagar district, Gujarat
 Kalol, Gandhinagar (Vidhan Sabha constituency)
 Kalol, Panchmahal, a town in Panchmahal district, Gujarat
 Kalol, Panchmahal (Vidhan Sabha constituency)